Inocybe griseolilacina, commonly known as the lilac leg fibrecap, is a mushroom in the family Inocybaceae. It was described scientifically by Danish mycologist Jakob Emanuel Lange in 1917. It is inedible.

See also
List of Inocybe species

References

griseolilacina
Fungi described in 1917
Fungi of Europe
Inedible fungi